The men's 50 metre freestyle competition at the 2013 Mediterranean Games was held on 22 June 2013 at the Mersin Olympic Swimming Pool.

Schedule 
All times are Eastern European Summer Time (UTC+03:00)

Records 
Prior to this competition, the existing world and Mediterranean Games records were as follows:

Results

Heats

Final

References 

Men's 50 metre freestyle